Futerra is an international sustainability strategy and creative agency with offices in London, New York and Stockholm. The company was founded in 2001 by entrepreneurs Solitaire Townsend and Ed Gillespie. The company specialises in branding, strategy, behaviour change and consumer campaigns in the field of sustainability.

History

In 2001, Solitaire Townsend and Ed Gillespie co-founded Futerra in London. Lucy Shea joined in 2003 and was later appointed CEO. In 2008, the company expanded its operations with the opening of an office in New York City and Stockholm in 2010.

References

International sustainability organizations